Musaeus of Athens (Mousaios) was a legendary polymath, philosopher, historian, prophet, seer, priest, poet, and musician, said to have been the founder of priestly poetry in Attica. He composed dedicatory and purificatory hymns and prose treatises, and oracular responses.

Attributed works
Herodotus reports that, during the reign of Peisistratus at Athens, the scholar Onomacritus collected and arranged the oracles of Musaeus but inserted forgeries of his own devising, later detected by Lasus of Hermione. The mystic and oracular verses and customs of Attica, especially of Eleusis, are connected with his name. A Titanomachia and Theogonia are also attributed to him by Gottfried Kinkel.

Reputation in antiquity
In 450 BC, the playwright Euripides in his play Rhesus describes him thus: "Musaeus, too, thy holy citizen, of all men most advanced in lore." In 380 BC, Plato says in his  Ion that poets are inspired by Orpheus and Musaeus but the greater are inspired by Homer. In the  Protagoras, Plato says that Musaeus was a hierophant and a prophet. In the Apology, Socrates says: "What would not a man give if he might converse with Orpheus and Musaeus and Hesiod and Homer? Nay, if this be true, let me die again and again." According to  Diodorus Siculus, Musaeus was the son of Orpheus, according to Tatian he was the disciple of Orpheus, but according to Diogenes Laërtius he was the son of Eumolpus. Alexander Polyhistor, Clement of Alexandria and  Eusebius say he was the teacher of Orpheus. Aristotle quotes him in Book VIII of his Politics: "Song is to mortals of all things the sweetest." According to Diogenes Laërtius he died and was buried at Phalerum, with the epitaph: "Musaeus, to his sire Eumolpus dear, in Phalerean soil lies buried here." According to Pausanias, he was buried on the Mouseion Hill, south-west of the Acropolis, where there was a statue dedicated to a Syrian. For this and other reasons, Artapanus of Alexandria, Alexander Polyhistor, Numenius of Apamea, and Eusebius identify Musaeus with Moses the Jewish lawbringer.  Musaeus is singled out in Book 6 of The Aeneid, as someone particularly admired by the souls of Elysium.

References

External links

Musaeus Fragments at demonax.info

Classical oracles
Ancient Greek writers
Oral poets
Ancient Athenians
Characters in Book VI of the Aeneid
Legendary Greek people
Moses